William Blankpayn (fl. 1390s) was a butcher who was member of Parliament for Malmesbury for the parliaments of January 1390, 1393, 1394, January 1397, and September 1397.

References 

Members of the Parliament of England for Malmesbury
English MPs January 1390
English MPs 1393
English MPs 1394
English MPs January 1397
English MPs September 1397
English butchers
Year of birth unknown